"The Dirt Road" is a song written by Mark Miller and Gregg Hubbard, and recorded by American country music band Sawyer Brown. It was released in November 1991 as the lead-off (or the second if "The Walk" is counted) single from their 1992 album The Dirt Road. It peaked at number 3 in the United States, while it was a number-one hit in Canada.

Content
The song's narrator is wanting to take the dirt road in his life, as he's been walking on it for years, and it has taken him where he needs to go. The dirt road represents working hard in life in contrast to walking on the a paved road which is considered "easy street."

Music video
The song's music video was directed by Michael Salomon, and features a man walking on a road, and the band performing the song in a barn. The band's guest star is banjo legend Earl Scruggs.

Chart positions

Year-end charts

References

Songs about roads
Sawyer Brown songs
1992 singles
Songs written by Mark Miller (musician)
Music videos directed by Michael Salomon
Curb Records singles
1991 songs